Joe Stevens (born July 25, 1938, in New York City) is an American photographer. He is known for his images of 1970s and 1980s rock musicians and bands such as David Bowie, the Sex Pistols, and The Clash. In the 1960s, he managed the Playhouse, a Greenwich Village coffee house, where he began taking pictures of musicians who performed at the coffee house. While working there, he was encouraged by photographer Jim Marshall. His 1965 image of Johnny Cash and guitarist Luther Perkins backstage at Carnegie Hall appeared in the 2019 public television series Country Music. Stevens does not have formal training in photography, but worked in the music business as road manager for Miriam Makeba and The Lovin' Spoonful. After encountering Marshall again at Woodstock, he decided he "had an eye" for photography and would make it his career.

Moving to England in 1971-1972, Stevens took photos for the International Times credited to "Captain Snaps" until he received a work permit. In 1972, Paul McCartney hired him on the recommendation of his wife Linda McCartney to photograph the Wings Over Europe Tour. Linda knew Stevens from her own career as a photographer. Stevens worked for the New Musical Express in London through much of the 1970s before returning to New York City, where he photographed the CBGB club scene, including early images of Debbie Harry and the Ramones.

Several images epitomize his offbeat style: Paul McCartney hiding his face in Linda's arms during their arrest for marijuana possession in Sweden. John Lennon wearing plastic bags on his hands as he marches to protest the 1971 obscenity trial of Oz magazine; Peter Gabriel covered with soap bubbles circa 1974 in the bathtub of Stevens' London flat; and the fight between the Sex Pistols and their audience at London's Nashville Rooms in 1976. The Gabriel photo was one of many by Stevens that appeared on the cover of NME.

In January 1978, Stevens photographed the Sex Pistols on their only American tour. When the group broke up in San Francisco, Stevens gave singer Johnny Rotten (John Lydon) airfare to New York City, and Rotten stayed with Stevens in his New York apartment before returning to London.

Stevens describes himself as a chronicler of history. In 2015, Thurston Moore of Sonic Youth said Stevens "was really the bridge between New York and London. . . . He was really significant in the whole history that was developing in new music at that time." In 2018, his photographs were used in the biography of Led Zeppelin guitarist Jimmy Page and autobiography of British-American media executive Les Hinton. His images continue to appear in the British magazine UNCUT and other publications.

Stevens lives in New Hampshire.

References

External links 
 

American photographers
1938 births
Living people